is a Japanese violinist.

Discography

Mini-albums

Max singles

Distribution

Filmography

TV series
NHK General TV

Nippon TV

Fuji Television

TV Asahi

Mainichi Broadcasting System

Asahi Broadcasting Corporation

Kyoto Broadcasting System, KTV Kyoto Channel

Radio series
FM-Kyoto

Tokyo FM

References

External links
  
 Official profile 

Japanese violinists
1984 births
Living people
People from Katano
Musicians from Osaka Prefecture
21st-century violinists